Qulan may refer to:

Iran
 Qulan,  a village Nowjeh Mehr Rural District, Jolfa County, East Azerbaijan Province.
 Qulan, Ahar, a village in Dodangeh Rural District, Ahar County, East Azerbaijan Province.

China
 Qulan, Hengyang, a town of Hengyang County, Hunan province.